Harplinge is a locality situated in Halmstad Municipality, Halland County, Sweden, with 1,597 inhabitants in 2020. the village is known for its beautiful surroundings and its nature.

References 

Populated places in Halmstad Municipality